Eduction or variants may refer to:

 Eduction (geology), a process in which the Earth's crust spreads sideways, exposing deep-seated rocks
 Eductor-jet pump, a form of injector pump
 A conclusion educed (induced or deduced) through a process of reasoning
 A substance educed (separated or extracted) from a chemical compound

See also 
 Education (disambiguation)
 Deductive reasoning, reasoning from premises to reach a logical conclusion
 Inductive reasoning, reasoning supplying some evidence, but not full assurance, of the truth of the conclusion
 Reactant, a substance or compound added to a system to cause a chemical reaction
 Product (chemistry), species formed from chemical reactions